Bareback is a form of horseback riding without a saddle.

Bareback  may also refer to:

 Bareback bronc riding, a rodeo event that involves a rodeo participant riding a bucking horse that attempts to throw or buck off the rider
 Bareback (sexual act), sexual penetration without a condom
 Bareback (album), a 1991 album by Wild Horses
 "Bareback" (song), a 2003 song by The Darkness